Lose All Time is the second album from Vancouver's You Say Party (formerly You Say Party! We Say Die!) and the first for their new label Paper Bag Records who released it on March 20, 2007.

"Downtown Mayors Goodnight, Alley Kids Rule!" reached #1 on CBC Radio 3's R3-30 chart the week of June 7, 2007.

The vinyl release of Lose All Time was released by Paper Bag Records in July 2007.  There were only 300 copies in Europe and 300 copies in North America ever produced.

UK Track listing 
 Five Year Plan (3:19)
 Downtown Mayors Goodnight, Alley Kids Rule! (2:29)
 Opportunity (3:44)
 Teenage Hit Wonder (2:38)
 Monster (3:38)
 Like I Give A Care (3:17)
 Poison (2:40)
 Moon (2:55)
 Giant Hands (3:25)
 You're Almost There (4:01)
 Dancefloor Destroyer (3:14)
 Midnight Snake (UK Bonus Recording) (3:29)
 Quiet World (22:52)
 Quit it     (23:34)

North American Track listing 
 Five Year Plan (3:19)
 Downtown Mayors Goodnight, Alley Kids Rule! (2:29)
 Opportunity (3:44)
 Teenage Hit Wonder (2:38)
 Monster (3:38)
 Like I Give A Care (3:17)
 Poison (2:40)
 Moon (2:55)
 Giant Hands (3:25)
 Dancefloor Destroyer (3:14)
 You're Almost There (4:01)
 Quiet World (22:52)

(There is an error in the track listing of the North American version.  Dancefloor Destroyer and You're Almost There are named in the track listing incorrectly.)

Japan Track listing 
 Quiet World (3:30)
 Five Year Plan (3:19)
 Downtown Mayors Goodnight, Alley Kids Rule! (2:29)
 Monster (3:38)
 Teenage Hit Wonder (2:38)
 Poison (2:40)
 Giant Hands (3:25)
 Machine Legs (Japan Bonus Track) (1:35)
 Moon (2:55)
 Dancefloor Destroyer (3:14)
 You're Almost There (4:01)
 Opportunity (3:44)
 Like I Give A Care (3:17)
 Midnight Snake (3:30)

 Monster (Bonus Enhanced Music Video)

2007 albums
Paper Bag Records albums
You Say Party albums